Grevillea oleoides, also known as red spider flower, is a species of flowering plant in the family Proteaceae and is endemic to eastern New South Wales. It is an erect shrub with egg-shaped leaves, the narrower end towards the base, sometimes elliptic or linear leaves and red or reddish-pink flowers usually within the foliage.

Description
The edges of the leaves are turned down or rolled under, the upper surface wrinkled and the lower surface covered with silky to woolly hairs.

Taxonomy
Grevillea oleoides was first formally described in 1827 by Josef August Schultes and Julius Hermann Schultes in their book Mantissa in volumen primum [-tertium] :Systematis vegetabilium caroli a Linné from an unpublished description by Franz Sieber. The specific epithet (oleoides), means similar to the European olive, Olea europaea.

Distribution
Red spider flower mainly occurs in the Sydney basin from Botany Bay and the Georges River to the northern Illawarra region, where it grows in dry sclerophyll woodland or heathland, often in moist locations near creeks or swamps.

References

oleoides
Flora of New South Wales
Proteales of Australia
Plants described in 1827
Taxa named by Josef August Schultes
Taxa named by Julius Hermann Schultes